Völs am Schlern (or ), often abbreviated to Völs, is a municipality in South Tyrol in northern Italy.

Geography

The municipality of Völs am Schlern contains the frazioni (subdivisions, mainly villages and hamlets) Blumau (Prato all'Isarco), Oberaicha (Aica di Sopra), Peterbühl, St. Anton (S. Antonio), Obervöls (Fiè di Sopra), Prösels (Presule), Prösler Ried (Novale di Presule), St. Kathrein (Santa Caterina), St. Konstantin (San Costantino), Ums (Umes), Unteraicha (Aica di Sotto), Untervöls (Fiè di Sotto), and Völser Ried (Novale di Fiè).

Völs am Schlern borders the following municipalities: Kastelruth, Karneid, Ritten and Tiers.

Prösels Castle is also located in the municipality.

History
The hamlet appears for the first time in the Carolingian period in a deed issued by king Arnolf in 888 named as „Fellis“, then located within the Bavarian duchy („in Bauuariae partibus sita inter montana“).

Coat-of-arms
The emblem is party per cross, the first and the fourth are sable with central band of argent, the first represents a cross and the fourth a rose both on gules. The emblem is a combination of the insignias of three local families, the first and fourth the Knights of Völs and Prösels and the third the Count Colonna. The emblem was adopted in 1966.

Society

Linguistic distribution
According to the 2011 census, 94.92% of the population speak German, 4.46% Italian and 0.62% Ladin as first language.

Demographic evolution

Culture

Music
Every summer Semper Music International Festival brings internationally renowned musicians and students from all over the world to Vōls am Schlern.

References

External links
 Homepage of the municipality

Municipalities of South Tyrol